Eli gun is an Indonesian six-barrel rotary machine gun made by local manufacturer PT Komodo Armament Indonesia. It can be used for various land, air, and sea vehicles. As a modular system, it is easily adapted to any existing platform. It uses the 7.62x51 mm NATO ammunition. The first prototype was unveiled in Indo Defence 2014 Expo & Forum. The weapon was a result of cooperation between Indonesia and Italy.

Potential contracts 

 A total of 200 units was reported to be ordered by undisclosed Middle Eastern countries. No signed deal available.
 Previously, the government of Italy was rumored to have bought 100 units, but no signed deal is confirmed.

See also 

 GShG-7.62
 Hua Qing Minigun
 M134 Minigun
 List of multiple-barrel firearms
 Multiple-barrel firearm

References

External link
 Eli gun on Komodo Armament website

7.62×51mm NATO machine guns
Aircraft guns
Indonesian inventions
Multi-barrel machine guns
Firearms of Indonesia